Leonard Donald Holder Jr. (born January 19, 1944)  is a retired lieutenant general in the United States Army. He was Commandant of the United States Army Command and General Staff College from July 19, 1995 to August 7, 1997.

He was inducted into the Fort Leavenworth Hall of Fame.

References

1944 births
Living people
United States Army generals